A formal system is an abstract structure used for inferring theorems from axioms according to a set of rules. These rules, which are used for carrying out the inference of theorems from axioms, are the logical calculus of the formal system. 
A formal system is essentially an "axiomatic system".

In 1921, David Hilbert proposed to use such a system as the foundation for the knowledge in mathematics. A formal system may represent a well-defined system of abstract thought.

The term formalism is sometimes a rough synonym for formal system, but it also refers to a given style of notation, for example, Paul Dirac's bra–ket notation.

Background

Each formal system is described by primitive symbols (which collectively form an alphabet) to finitely construct a formal language from a set of axioms through inferential rules of formation.

The system thus consists of valid formulas built up through finite combinations of the primitive symbols—combinations that are formed from the axioms in accordance with the stated rules.

More formally, this can be expressed as the following:

 A finite set of symbols, known as the alphabet, which are concatenated into finite strings called formulas.
 A grammar consisting of rules to form formulas from simpler formulas. A formula is said to be well-formed if it can be formed using the rules of the formal grammar. It is often required that there be a decision procedure for deciding whether a formula is well-formed.
 A set of axioms, or axiom schemata, consisting of well-formed formulas.
 A set of inference rules. A well-formed formula that can be inferred from the axioms is known as a theorem of the formal system.

Recursive

A formal system is said to be recursive (i.e. effective) or recursively enumerable if the set of axioms and the set of inference rules are decidable sets or semidecidable sets, respectively.

Inference and entailment

The entailment of the system by its logical foundation is what distinguishes a formal system from others which may have some basis in an abstract model. Often the formal system will be the basis for or even identified with a larger theory or field (e.g. Euclidean geometry) consistent with the usage in modern mathematics such as model theory.

Formal language 

A formal language is a language that is defined by a formal system. Like languages in linguistics, formal languages generally have two aspects:

 the syntax of a language is what the language looks like (more formally: the set of possible expressions that are valid utterances in the language) studied in formal language theory
 the semantics of a language are what the utterances of the language mean (which is formalized in various ways, depending on the type of language in question)

In computer science and linguistics usually only the syntax of a formal language is considered via the notion of a formal grammar. A formal grammar is a precise description of the syntax of a formal language: a set of strings. The two main categories of formal grammar are that of generative grammars, which are sets of rules for how strings in a language can be generated, and that of analytic grammars (or reductive grammar,) which are sets of rules for how a string can be analyzed to determine whether it is a member of the language. In short, an analytic grammar describes how to recognize when strings are members in the set, whereas a generative grammar describes how to write only those strings in the set.

In mathematics, a formal language is usually not described by a formal grammar but by (a) natural language, such as English. Logical systems are defined by both a deductive system and natural language. Deductive systems in turn are only defined by natural language (see below).

Deductive system 
A deductive system, also called a deductive apparatus or a logic, consists of the axioms (or axiom schemata) and rules of inference that can be used to derive theorems of the system.

Such deductive systems preserve deductive qualities in the formulas that are expressed in the system. Usually the quality we are concerned with is truth as opposed to falsehood. However, other modalities, such as justification or belief may be preserved instead.

In order to sustain its deductive integrity, a deductive apparatus must be definable without reference to any intended interpretation of the language. The aim is to ensure that each line of a derivation is merely a syntactic consequence of the lines that precede it. There should be no element of any interpretation of the language that gets involved with the deductive nature of the system.

An example of deductive system is first order predicate logic.

Logical system 
A logical system or language (not be confused with the kind of "formal language" discussed above which is described by a formal grammar), is a deductive system (see section above; most commonly first order predicate logic) together with additional (non-logical) axioms. According to model theory, a logical system may be given one or more semantics or interpretations which describe whether a well-formed formula is satisfied by a given structure. A structure that satisfies all the axioms of the formal system is known as a model of the logical system. A logical system is sound if each well-formed formula that can be inferred from the axioms is satisfied by every model of the logical system. Conversely, a logic system is (semantically) complete if each well-formed formula that is satisfied by every model of the logical system can be inferred from the axioms.

An example of a logical system is Peano arithmetic. The standard model of arithmetic sets the domain of discourse to be the nonnegative integers and gives the symbols their usual meaning. There are also non-standard models of arithmetic.

History
Early logic systems includes Indian logic of Pāṇini, syllogistic logic of Aristotle, propositional logic of Stoicism, and Chinese logic of Gongsun Long (c. 325–250 BCE) .  In more recent times, contributors include George Boole, Augustus De Morgan, and Gottlob Frege.  Mathematical logic was developed in 19th century Europe.

Formalism

Hilbert's program

David Hilbert instigated a formalist movement that was eventually tempered by Gödel's incompleteness theorems.

QED manifesto

The QED manifesto represented a subsequent, as yet unsuccessful, effort at formalization of known mathematics.

Examples 

Examples of formal systems include:

 Lambda calculus
 Predicate calculus
 Propositional calculus

Variants

The following systems are variations of formal systems.

Proof system 

Formal proofs are sequences of well-formed formulas (or wff for short). For a wff to qualify as part of a proof, it might either be an axiom or be the product of applying an inference rule on previous wffs in the proof sequence. The last wff in the sequence is recognized as a theorem.

The point of view that generating formal proofs is all there is to mathematics is often called formalism. David Hilbert founded metamathematics as a discipline for discussing formal systems.  Any language that one uses to talk about a formal system is called a metalanguage.  The metalanguage may be a natural language, or it may be partially formalized itself, but it is generally less completely formalized than the formal language component of the formal system under examination, which is then called the object language, that is, the object of the discussion in question.

Once a formal system is given, one can define the set of theorems which can be proved inside the formal system. This set consists of all wffs for which there is a proof. Thus all axioms are considered theorems. Unlike the grammar for wffs, there is no guarantee that there will be a decision procedure for deciding whether a given wff is a theorem or not. The notion of theorem just defined should not be confused with theorems about the formal system, which, in order to avoid confusion, are usually called metatheorems.

See also 

 Formal method
 Formal science
 Rewriting system
 Substitution instance
 Theory (mathematical logic)

References

Further reading 
 Raymond M. Smullyan, 1961. Theory of Formal Systems: Annals of Mathematics Studies, Princeton University Press (April 1, 1961) 156 pages 
 Stephen Cole Kleene, 1967. Mathematical Logic Reprinted by Dover, 2002. 
 Douglas Hofstadter, 1979. Gödel, Escher, Bach: An Eternal Golden Braid . 777 pages.

External links

 Encyclopædia Britannica, Formal system definition, 2007.
What is a Formal System?: Some quotes from John Haugeland's `Artificial Intelligence: The Very Idea' (1985), pp. 48–64.
 Peter Suber, Formal Systems and Machines: An Isomorphism , 1997.

Metalogic
Syntax (logic)
 
System
1st-millennium BC introductions
4th century BC in India